Tomás Ó Maolalaidh (died 28 April 1536) was an Irish churchman who became Bishop of Clonmacnoise (c.1509-1514) and Archbishop of Tuam (1514–1536).

He held a synod at Galway in 1523, attended by bishops of Kilmacduagh, Achonry Clonmacnoise, Kilfenora, Ross, in addition to representatives of the dioceses of Elphin, Killala and Armagh. Died 28 April 1536 and buried in the Franciscan church of Galway under the same monument with his predecessor, Muiris Ó Fithcheallaigh. Succeeded by Christopher Bodkin, who was in turn succeeded by Dr William Ó Mullally, Protestant Archbishop of Tuam, son of Tomás.

Children

His son, William Ó Mullaly was formerly Dean of Tuam, and was nominated as Archbishop on 11 Nov 1572, and appointed by Queen Elizabeth I as Archbishop of Tuam. He was consecrated on 14 April 1573.

Other members of his immediate family included:
 Seán Ó Maolalaidh, Chief of the Name (died 1481) his father
 Conchobair Ó Maolalaidh, Bishop of Clonfert (1447–1448), Emly (1448–1449) and Elphin (1449–1468)
 Thomas Arthur, comte de Lally, baron de Tollendal (1702–1766)

References

History of O'Mullally and Lally clans ..., by D.P. O'Mullally, Chicago, 1941.
 A New History of Ireland: Volume IX: Maps, Genealogies, Lists: A Companion to Irish History, Part II, ed. T. W. Moody, F. X. Martin, Francis John Byrne.

Archbishops of Tuam
16th-century Irish bishops
People from County Galway
Medieval Gaels from Ireland
1536 deaths
Year of birth unknown
Bishops of Clonmacnoise